Vajrayoginī (Nepal Bhasa:Hyāu Khwā Māju ह्याउ ख्वा माजु, Dorjé Neljorma;) is a Tantric Buddhist female Buddha and a . The Vajrayogini cult dates back to the tenth and twelfth centuries. Vajrayoginī's essence is "great passion" (maharaga), a transcendent passion that is free of selfishness and illusion—she intensely works for the well-being of others and for the destruction of ego clinging. She is seen as being ideally suited for people with strong passions, providing the way to transform those passions into enlightened virtues.

She is an Anuttarayoga Tantra iṣṭadevatā (meditation deity) and her practice includes methods for preventing ordinary death, intermediate state (bardo) and rebirth (samsara) by transforming them into paths to enlightenment, and for transforming all mundane daily experiences into higher spiritual paths. Practices associated with her are Chöd and the Six Yogas of Naropa.

Vajrayoginī is often described with the epithet sarvabuddhaḍākiṇī, meaning "the  [who is the Essence] of all Buddhas".

According to scholar Miranda Shaw, Vajrayoginī is "inarguably the supreme deity of the Tantric pantheon. No male Buddha, including her divine consort, Heruka Cakrasaṃvara, approaches her in metaphysical or practical import."

Origin and lineage
Vajrayoginī's sādhanā originated between the tenth and twelfth centuries against the backdrop of non-Buddhist Shaiva tantras. The Buddhist Yoginitantras that deal with yoginis and dakinis draw from Saiva scriptures. The  in particular contains numerous passages that were adapted from Saiva sources. The text and its commentaries have revealed numerous attempts by Buddhists to enlarge and modify it, both to remove references to Saiva deities and to add more Buddhist technical terminology.

The practice of Vajrayoginī belongs to the Mother Tantra class of Anuttarayoga Tantras along with other tantras such as the Cakrasaṃvara and Hevajra Tantras.

Vajrayana teaches that the two stages of the practice of Vajrayoginī (generation stage and completion stage) were originally taught by Vajradhara. He manifested in the form of Heruka to expound the Root Tantra of Chakrasaṃvara, and it was in this tantra that he explained the practice of Vajrayoginī. All the many lineages of instructions on Vajrayoginī can be traced back to this original revelation. Of these lineages, there are three that are most commonly practiced: the Narokhachö lineage, which was transmitted from Vajrayoginī to Naropa; the Maitrikhachö lineage, which was transmitted from Vajrayoginī to Maitripa; and the Indrakhachö lineage, which was transmitted from Vajrayoginī to Indrabodhi.

Iconography
Vajrayoginī is visualized as the translucent, deep red form of a 16-year-old female with the third eye of wisdom set vertically on her forehead and unbound flowing hair. Vajrayoginī's khaṭvāṅga is marked with a vajra and from it hangs a damaru drum, a bell, and a triple banner. Her extended right leg treads on the chest of red Kālarātri, while her bent left leg treads on the forehead of black Bhairava, bending his head backward and pressing it into his back at the level of his heart. Her head is adorned with a crown of five human skulls and she wears a necklace of fifty human skulls. She is depicted as standing in the center of a blazing fire of exalted wisdom. Her countenance shows both erotic and fierce features, "in the fullness of bliss, laughing and baring her fangs."

Each aspect of Vajrayoginī's form and mandala is designed to convey a spiritual meaning. For example, her brilliant red-colored body symbolizes the blazing of her tummo (candali) or "inner fire" of spiritual transformation as well as life force (Shakti), blood of birth and menstrual blood. Her single face symbolizes that she has realized that all phenomena are of one nature in emptiness. Her two arms symbolize her realization of the two truths. Her three eyes symbolize her ability to see everything in the past, present and future. She looks upward toward the Pure Dākiṇī Land, demonstrating her attainment of outer and inner Pure Dākiṇī Land, and indicating that she leads her followers to these attainments. The curved driguk knife in her right hand shows her power to cut the continuum of the delusions and obstacles of her followers and of all living beings. Drinking the blood from the kapala in her left hand symbolizes her experience of supreme bliss.

Vajravārāhī and other forms

Vajrayoginī is a female deity and although she is sometimes visualized as simply Vajrayoginī, in a collection of her sādhanās she is visualized in an alternate form in over two thirds of the practices. Her other forms include Vajravārāhī ( "Vajra Sow") and Krodikali (alt.

In her form as Vajravārāhī "the Vajra Sow", she is often pictured with a sow's head on the side of her own as an ornament and in one form has the head of a sow herself. Vajrayoginī is often associated with triumph over ignorance, the pig being associated with ignorance in Buddhism. This sow head relates to the origins of Vajravārāhī from the Hindu sow-faced goddess Vārāhī.

The severed-headed form of Vajrayoginī is similar to the Indian goddess Chinnamasta, who is recognized by both Hindus and Buddhists.

Practices

Vajrayoginī acts as a meditation deity, or the yab-yum consort of such a deity, in Vajrayāna Buddhism.  She appears in a  that is visualized by the practitioner according to a sādhana describing the practice of the particular tantra. There are several collections containing sādhanas associated with Vajrayoginī including one collection, the Guhyasamayasādhanamālā, containing only Vajrayoginī sādhanas and comprising forty-six works by various authors.

In this form she is also the consort of Jinasagara (Tib. Gyalwa Gyatso), the red Avalokiteśvara (Tib. Chenrezig).

Vajrayoginī is a key figure in the advanced Tibetan Buddhist practice of Chöd, where she appears in her Kālikā or Vajravārāhī (Tibetan:rDo rje phag mo) forms.

Vajrayoginī also appears in versions of Guru yoga in the Kagyu school of Tibetan Buddhism. In one popular system the practitioner worships their guru in the form of Milarepa, whilst visualizing themself as Vajrayoginī.

The purpose of visualizing Vajrayoginī is to gain realizations of generation stage tantra, in which the practitioner mentally visualises themself as their yidam or meditational deity and their surroundings as the Deity's . The purpose of generation stage is to overcome ordinary appearances and ordinary conceptions, which are said in Vajrayana Buddhism to be the obstructions to liberation (Skt. ) and enlightenment.

Vajrayogini temples
In the Kathmandu valley of Nepal there are several important Newar temples dedicated to different forms of Vajrayogini. These temples are important power places of Nepalese Vajrayana Buddhism and are also important pilgrimage places for Tibetan Buddhists. These temples include the Sankhu Vajrayogini temple, Vidhyeshvari Vajrayogini temple, Parping Vajrayogini temple, and the Guhyeshwari temple.

Emanations

Samding Dorje Phagmo

The female tulku who was the abbess of Samding Monastery, on the shores of the Yamdrok Tso Lake, near Gyantse, Tibet was traditionally a  emanation of Vajravārāhī (Tibetan: Dorje Phagmo). The lineage started in the 15th century with the princess of Gungthang, Chökyi Drönma (Wylie: Chos-kyi sgron-me)(1422–1455). She became known as Samding Dorje Pagmo (Wylie:bSam-lding rDo-rje phag-mo) and began a line of female tulkus, reincarnate lamas. Charles Alfred Bell met the tulku in 1920 and took photographs of her, calling her Dorje Pamo in his book. The current incarnation, the 12th of this line, resides in Lhasa.

See also

Dorje Pakmo
Machig Labdrön
Mandarava
Narodakini
Prajnaparamita
Simhamukha
Yeshe Tsogyal

References

Citations

Works cited

Further reading

External links
 Red Vajravarahi on himalayanart.org
 Vajravarahi Mandala on asianart.com
 Desire and Devotion: Exhibit on Asian Art—Vajravarahi with Retinue

Buddhas
 
Tibetan art
Female buddhas and supernatural beings
Wisdom goddesses
Dakinis